John or Jonathan Earle may refer to:

John Earle (bishop) (c. 1601–1665), English bishop
John Earle (divine) (1749–1818), English Catholic divine
John Earle (professor) (1824–1903), British Anglo-Saxon language scholar
John Earle (Australian politician) (1865–1932), first Labor Premier of Tasmania
John B. Earle (1766–1836), United States Representative from South Carolina
John Milton Earle (1794–1874), American businessman and abolitionist
John Earle (American football) (born 1968), Former NFL/CFL player
Jack Earle (1906–1952), American silent film actor
John Earle (musician) (1944–2008), Irish saxophone player
Jonathan F. Earle, Florida academic who won the NSF Presidential Award for Excellence in Science, Mathematics and Engineering Mentoring
Jonathan H. Earle, Louisiana academic specialising in the history of the antebellum United States
John Earle Sullivan (born 1995), activist and photojournalist

See also
 John Earl (disambiguation)
Jonathan Earle Arnold (1814–1869), American lawyer and politician